The Kawasaki Z800 is a Z series four-cylinder standard motorcycle made by Kawasaki from 2013 through 2016, replaced by the Z900 for 2017.

History 

Using the nomenclature of the Kawasaki's Z series begun in 1972,  the Z800 is the follow-up of the Z750 which had been introduced in 2004 as successor of the ZR-7.

References

External links 

 
 Z800 review at topspeed.com – with UK specs
 Z800 road test at 1000ps.at (German language) – with picture gallery and videos

Z800
Standard motorcycles
Motorcycles introduced in 2013